This is a list of awards and nominations received by South Korean singer-songwriter, rapper and model Kim Hyun-ah, known mononymously as Hyuna.

She debuted as a member of the girl group Wonder Girls in February 2007. After leaving the ensemble shortly after, Hyuna subsequently left JYP Entertainment and joined the girl group 4Minute, under Cube Entertainment. 4Minute debuted in June 2009 and went on to become one of the most popular girl groups in the country. In 2010, Hyuna began a solo career with a style she described as "performance-oriented music". Her debut single "Change" charted at number-two on South Korea's Gaon Digital Chart.

In 2011, Hyuna gained wider public recognition with the release of her first extended play Bubble Pop!. The title track sold more than three million digital copies and she became the first female K-pop solo artist to reach 100 million views on a single music video on YouTube. Later the same year, she formed the duo Trouble Maker with former Beast member Hyunseung, releasing the hit single "Trouble Maker". In 2012, she appeared in a successful duet rendition of Psy's worldwide hit "Gangnam Style" and later released her second extended play Melting, which featured the number-one single "Ice Cream". Her next two extended plays A Talk and A+ yielded the successful singles "Red" and "Roll Deep", respectively. Following 4Minute's disbandment in mid-2016, she released her fifth extended play A'wesome, which was supported by her first concert tour The Queen's Back. In 2017, she was involved in the trio Triple H with Pentagon members Hui and E'Dawn before releasing her sixth extended play Following and her first single album Lip & Hip.

In 2018, Hyuna ended her contract with Cube Entertainment after several internal conflicts, and signed with Psy's P Nation the following year. Her first digital single under  P Nation Flower Shower became her seventh top-ten entry on the US Billboard World Digital Song Sales. In 2021, Hyuna released her seventh extended play I'm Not Cool. In September, Hyuna and Dawn collaborated to release their duet extended play 1+1=1. In 2022, Hyuna released her eighth extended play Nabillera which is her last solo released under P Nation following her departure from the company in August 2022.


Awards and nominations

Other accolades

Listicles

Notes

References

Hyuna